The Buick Championship was a golf tournament co-sanctioned on the Ladies European Tour and the China LPGA Tour since 2015. It was first played as the Buick Ladies Invitational on the China LPGA Tour in 2014 and was held at the Qizhong Golf Club in Shanghai, China.

Winners

* Won in a playoff

References

Former Ladies European Tour events
Golf tournaments in China
Recurring sporting events established in 2014
Recurring sporting events disestablished in 2016
2014 establishments in China
2016 disestablishments in China